Robertsburg is an unincorporated community in Putnam County, West Virginia, United States. Robertsburg had a post office, which opened on August 6, 1900, and closed on May 10, 1997.

The community was named after Samuel Roberts, an early settler and pioneer businessperson in the local lumber industry.

References

Unincorporated communities in Putnam County, West Virginia
Unincorporated communities in West Virginia
Populated places on the Kanawha River